Babelomurex latipinnatus is a species of sea snail, a marine gastropod mollusc in the family Muricidae, the murex snails or rock snails.

References

External links
 Oliverio M. (2008) Coralliophilinae (Neogastropoda: Muricidae) from the southwest Pacific. In: V. Héros, R.H. Cowie & P. Bouchet (eds), Tropical Deep-Sea Benthos 25. Mémoires du Muséum National d'Histoire Naturelle 196: 481–585, at page 521.

latipinnatus
Gastropods described in 1961